Ruthton may refer to:

Ruthton, Kentucky, an unincorporated community located in Madison County
Ruthton, Minnesota, a city in Pipestone County
Ruthton, Nebraska, an unincorporated community in Keith County